is the third album by the Japanese idol girl group AKB48.

"Koko ni Ita Koto" was released in Japan on June 8, 2011 by King Records. There are three versions available: Limited Edition (catalog number KIZC-90117/8), Regular Edition (KIZC-117/8), and Theater Edition (NKCD-6546).

While all the group's albums had been almost entirely collections of previously released material, "Koko ni Ita Koto" took a different approach. Although it featured four 2010 hits, one theatre stage song, and a theme from an early 2011 movie, the rest were new songs.

It met with great commercial success, topping the Oricon Weekly Albums Chart and, with just one week of sales, placed second in the list of best selling albums of the first half of 2011 in Japan. In the same month, it was already certified Million by the Recording Industry Association of Japan for shipments of over one million copies.

Background
The upcoming release of the first AKB48's original album was announced on February 21, 2011. The then-unnamed album would be released on April 6, 2011 and contain the hits "Ponytail to Chouchou", "Heavy Rotation", "Beginner", and "Chance no Junban", the rest being new songs. In addition to a regular edition, there would be a limited edition of the album and a theater edition. The limited edition would contain a 100-page photobook shot by photographer Mika Ninagawa, who was the director of their Heavy Rotation music video, a DVD, lottery entry card to win a special present from the band and also comes with a photo in 14 types, while the regular came with 14 alternate changeable covers featuring them in circus costumes and also the DVD which was featured in limited edition and the theater edition would be a CD-only version coming with 14 alternate changeable covers featuring them in school uniforms, a handshake event ticket and a photo of an AKB48 member chosen at random.

More details were announced at a group's handshake event on March 5, 2011. 11 of 16 songs on the album would be completely new. "Shōjotachi yo", the theme song for AKB48's movie Documentary of AKB48 to be continued, would also be on the album. On the title track AKB48 would be joined by the sister groups SKE48, SDN48, and NMB48.

Due to the 2011 Tohoku earthquake and tsunami, the album's release date was pushed back to June 8, 2011. Part of the revenues from it goes to the victims of the disaster. Also, handshakes and photos with the group members, that were planned to be a theater edition bonus, were replaced by the right to choose 5 member photos.

Reception

Commercial performance 
Koko ni Ita Koto was sold in 601,985 copies in its debut week, topping the Oricon Weekly Albums Chart

In June 2011, the album was certified Million by the Recording Industry Association of Japan for shipments of over one million copies.

Album reviews 
James Hadfield of Time Out Tokyo gave it zero out of five stars, calling it "wrenchingly awful", and compared it "perhaps to hearing Alvin and the Chipmunks play Stevie Wonder's 'Happy Birthday' on repeat for an equivalent length of time while being force-fed candy floss until your stomach splits open. ... It's J-pop that's been infantilised, reduced to the level of kindergarten songs. That half of the tracks are wedded to the same pachinko four-four beat serves merely to make it all the more deadening." Another review claims that it's hard to experience the full album since half of the songs are bland to him. However, some of the songs are still highly praised.  Beginner was described as "freaking cool" and gave ten out of ten stars. Heavy Rotation is "perfect pop goodness" and "really awesome", etc. There is a review said that "the music is also fun to listen to and for me that's what counts the most."

Track listing

CD

Limited Edition DVD

Bonuses

Limited Edition 
 100-page photobook by Mika Ninagawa
 Photo of a member (randomly chosen from a set of 14)
 AKB48 special present lottery ticket

Regular Edition 
 Set of 14 circus clothes alternate covers (7 double-sided pictures)

Theater Edition 
 Set of 14 school uniform alternate covers (7 double-sided pictures)
 5 solo member photos (customer selectable from a set of 2100)

Charts

Sales and certifications

Release history

References

External links 
 Regular Edition details at the King Records official website 
 Limited Edition details at the King Records official website 
 Regular Edition profile at the Oricon website 

2011 albums
AKB48 albums
King Records (Japan) albums